is an animated series co-produced by d-rights Inc., NewBoy., SBS Productions Inc. and Stonebridge Capital Inc., under the direction of Mitsuo Hashimoto. The series is set in a futuristic universe of races involving the use of miniature automated toy cars. The TV animation lasts for 52 episodes and is targeted to boys from 4–12 years old. The series has been licensed by Cookie Jar Entertainment for North and South American audiences and dubbed by Ocean Productions and Blue Water Studios. In the United States, the series premiered September 1, 2012, on Cartoon Network. While the last 7 episodes have not been shown in the United States, all 52 episodes have been broadcast on YTV and Pop Max, and are also airing on K2 In Italy. In Indonesia, Scan2Go also broadcast too, by Indosiar.

Synopsis
The animated series takes place in a futuristic universe. Many species throughout the galaxies are all excited for one thing: racing. This racing trend is what everyone knows it as, Scan2Go. This racing activity involves the use of miniature automated toy cars in which the cars race automatically, gunning for 1st place. The cars are powered by a cards which gives them the power to race and as well as turbo boosts. Scan2Go is a one-lap sprint race on huge tracks where speed and tactics are the key to winning. Racers will face many obstacles on the track, which can be dangerous or very tricky. Races can be done in teams or free-for-all, depending on the rules.

The story focuses on a young boy named Kazuya 'Kaz' Gordon and his team called "Team Jet", more formerly known as the "Junior Earth Team". Starting his Scan2Go career from Earth, during which humans aren't fond of the Scan2Go trend yet, he embarks on a journey to become the greatest Scan2Go racer ever. Kaz is only in it to become the best racer in the universe. But he also discovers new friends along his way to glory.

He discovers a strong opponent and his greatest enemy who destroyed the Scan2Go committee named Ryu Kaizel. His aim is to conquer the negative emotions of people and begin destruction of the Universe.

Merchandise

Toy
Scan2Go consists of a car and two types of cards, the power card and the turbo card. There are 20 Scan2Go cars which come in a variety of models, each associated with a character in the story.

Innovate Technology
The Innovate technology allows a player to program the car to activate power turbo sequences during the race.

 Power Cards (12 levels)
Determines how strong the turbo engine boosts up. Each of the 12 cars has 12 different design for the power cards. Each of the designs reflects different power level.
 Turbo Cards (6 levels)
Determines how many times the turbo engine boosts up. There are six levels of turbo cards for each of the 12 cars.

Episodes

Music
All music and sound-score composed, performed and produced by John Mitchell and Tom Keenlyside at Anitunes Music Inc..

Main Characters

English

Japanese

Other Characters
Monkey: Member of Team Dradd.
Utan: Member of Team Dradd.
Pansy: Member of Team Dradd.
Dile: Member of Team Dradd.
Kohebiko: Member of the Space Pirates.
Daijako: Member of the Space Pirates.
Ray: Member of Team J.E.T.
System P.E.L.: Member of Team J.E.T.
Tsukikage: Member of Team J.E.T.
Toto: Fiona's pet
DJ: The commentator/announcer
Master Hipopo: He is a Scan2Go teacher 
Titi: She is a very little-kiddish cat-girl pop idol.
Chacha: Titi's manager & cat-girl.
Barry Garry and Jerry: The Eternally Passionate Guys.

Staff
 Series Original Plan: NewBoy, d-rights
 Executive Producers: Daizo Suzuki, Manar Tarabichi, Mohammed Tarabichi, Jinwon Kim, Tommy Kim
 Planning/Observer: Hamook Sung
 Directors: Mitsuo Hashimoto, Chan Young Park
 Assistant Director: Taiji Kawanishi
 Series Composition: Katsumi Hasegawa
 Character Designs: Yoshihiro Nagamori, Jong Sik Nam
 Character Design Assistant: Akiko Sato
 Machine Design: Ikuro Ishihara
 Race Planner: Issei Kume
 Art Directors: Nobuhito Sakamoto, Hoy-young Lee
 Color Supervisor: Chiho Nakamura
 Director of Photography: Yuya Kumazawa
 CG Director: Tomohiko Kan
 CG: Nam Suk Yun
 Editor: Keiko Onodera
 Sound Director: Hozumi Goda
 Music: Ocean Group, Meridian Entertainment Ltd.
 Composition Management: Masako Uchiura
 Associate Producer: Masataka Katagiri
 Animation Producers: Atsushi Tanaka, Kum Nam Cho (eps 1-18) (credited as Kun Nam Cho) → Ha Maria (eps 19-52)
 Assistant Producers: Hajime Watanabe, Saori Nakamura, Seung Won Nam
 Producer: Rika Sasaki
 General Producers: Takamoto Miura, Nabil Madi, Hamook Sung, Jiwoong Park
 Animation Studio: SynergySP
 Produced by d-rights, NewBoy, SBS Contents Hub, Stonebridge Capital

International Broadcast

References

External links
 Official website for Scan2Go
 
 Scan2Go on IMDb

2010s South Korean animated television series
2010 anime television series debuts
Japanese children's animated action television series
Japanese children's animated adventure television series
Japanese children's animated science fantasy television series
Japanese children's animated sports television series
South Korean children's animated action television series
South Korean children's animated adventure television series
South Korean children's animated science fantasy television series
Television series by Cookie Jar Entertainment
Television series by DHX Media
Animated television series about auto racing
NewBoy